The Department of National Resources was an Australian government department that existed between December 1975 and December 1977.

Scope
Information about the department's functions and/or government funding allocation could be found in the Administrative Arrangements Orders, the annual Portfolio Budget Statements and in the Department's annual reports.

At its creation, the Department's functions were:
Evaluation and balanced development of mineral, water and energy resources having regard to future requirements.
Geodesy, mapping

Structure
The Department was a Commonwealth Public Service department, staffed by officials who were responsible to the Minister for National Resources, Doug Anthony.

References

Ministries established in 1975
National Resources